Tidnish is a community in Cumberland County, Nova Scotia, Canada. The community has a population of 1,327 and a community center located at 4358 Highway 366, RR#2.

Community area includes Tidnish River, Tidnish Bridge and Tidnish Cross Roads.

References
 Tidnish on Destination Nova Scotia 
Community Data, NS Government

Communities in Cumberland County, Nova Scotia
General Service Areas in Nova Scotia